Fusoma is a genus of fungi with unknown classification.

The genus was first described by Corda in 1837.

The species of this genus are found in Europe and Northern America.

Species:
 Fusoma biseptatum
 Fusoma heraclei
 Fusoma parasiticum

References

Pezizomycotina
Ascomycota genera
Ascomycota enigmatic taxa